Conabeer Chrysler Building is a historic auto showroom located at Asheville, Buncombe County, North Carolina. It was built in 1928, and is a three-story steel frame building faced in orange brick and limestone.  It features a tall decorated parapet.  The building was erected as a new home for the Conabeer Motor Company, the local Chrysler agency.

It was listed on the National Register of Historic Places in 1979.

References

External links

Commercial buildings on the National Register of Historic Places in North Carolina
Commercial buildings completed in 1928
Buildings and structures in Asheville, North Carolina
National Register of Historic Places in Buncombe County, North Carolina
1928 establishments in North Carolina